The 2016 Miami Hurricanes baseball team will represent the University of Miami during the 2015 NCAA Division I baseball season. The Hurricanes will play their home games at Mark Light Field at Alex Rodriguez Park as a member of the Atlantic Coast Conference. They will be led by head coach Jim Morris, in his 22nd season at Miami.

Rankings

References

Miami Hurricanes
Miami Hurricanes baseball seasons
Miami
College World Series seasons
Miami